Yeardot is a television and web production for Channel 4 by So Television and Holler. It began on 30 June 2008, and follows the lives of fifteen young people from across the United Kingdom as they go through a pivotal year in each of their lives. The project ended after 12 months at the end of June 2009.

Introduction
The project took place both online at the Yeardot website as well as in a series of TV programmes on Channel 4 as part of their educational schedule. The fifteen participants set goals for themselves that they hoped to achieve over the following twelve months.

Participants
Participants in the show are young people who are attempting to succeed in their chosen vocation or else are attempting to overcome some challenge. Included are; Jamel Haynes, an ex-homeless man, who wants to stay off the streets; and Simon Jenkins, who hopes to progress as a comedian. Josh Muggleton has Asperger syndrome and hopes to complete a successful first year at the University of St Andrews. Also partaking are; Isobella Hatwell, who hopes to stage her play Wasted; Gilly Flaherty, who play's defense premier league football for Arsenal L.F.C. and also plays for England; Claire Hazelgrove, who is a prospective Labour Party candidate for election: one of the youngest to do so; and Chloe Spiteri is an 18-year-old with severe learning difficulties who hopes to progress as a wrestler after winning the English junior championships in March 2008 as well as other young people (see list below).

List of participants

{| border="1"
|+ Participants in Yeardot
! Name !! Age !! Occupation*/Dream**
|-
! Aaron Augustus
| 20 || Dancer*/Open Company**
|-
! Nicolette Ester
|16
|Leaving home for boarding school*
|-
! Gilly Flaherty
|16
|Plays football for Arsenal ladies*and England
|-
! Isobella Hatwell
|17
|Playwright**
|-
! Jamal Haynes
|19
|Stay off streets**
|-
! Claire Hazelgrove
|20
|Labour Candidate* for MP for Skipton and Ripon
|-
! Jade Heusen
|18
|Classical ballerina* with major company**
|-
! Simon Jenkins
|20
|Comedian*
|-
! Sheila Lord
|17
|Singer/songwriter**
|-
! Joshua Muggleton
|19
|Student and Autism speaker, writer and consultant*
|-
! Tom Mursell
|19
|Entrepreneur*
|-
! Akilah Russell
|19
|Print journalist**
|-
! Chloe Spiteri
|18
|Olympic Wrestler**
|-
! Deborah Stevenson
|17
|Poet*
|-
|}

Participant profiles

Claire Hazelgrove

Claire Ruth Hazelgrove (born 16 July 1988) was the prospective Labour candidate for parliamentary election for Skipton and Ripon.  At time of selection she was the second youngest Parliamentary Candidate in party history, Emily Benn being the youngest. Hazelgrove studies Politics at the University of York and has volunteered for three years for Sally Keeble MP. If elected, she could have become the youngest ever MP since the Reform Act 1832. The current record holder is Esmond Harmsworth, elected on 15 November 1919 from Isle of Thanet, aged 21 years 170 days. The youngest female MP was, until 2015, Bernadette Devlin, elected on 17 April 1969 from Mid Ulster, aged 21 years 359 days. On 7 May 2015, Mhairi Black became the youngest ever female MP, and youngest MP since the Reform Act 1832, aged 20 years and 237 days old.

Josh Muggleton

Joshua Thomas Bailey Muggleton (born 7 July 1989, Surrey) is currently studying Psychology at the University of St Andrews in Scotland. Josh was diagnosed with Asperger syndrome, an autism spectrum disorder, in 2004, and is the youngest ever elected councillor of the National Autistic Society. He talks and lectures widely to parents, teachers and others professionals about living with autism, and has been interviewed by TV, radio and national newspapers.

External links
 Official Yeardot Website
 4Talent magazine article
 Joshua Muggletons Website
 Tom Mursell's apprenticeships website

References

Channel 4 original programming
Documentary films about adolescence
2008 British television series debuts
2009 British television series endings